Allan Maxwel Borges Gomiero (born February 15, 1988 in Campinas), known as Allan Borges, Allan Gomiero or simply Allan, is a Brazilian footballer who played as midfielder.

Career statistics

References

External links

1988 births
Living people
Brazilian footballers
Association football forwards
Associação Atlética Internacional (Limeira) players
Ituano FC players
Treze Futebol Clube players
Capivariano Futebol Clube players
Clube Atlético Votuporanguense players
Sportspeople from Campinas